Ambala Cantonment is a cantonment town in Ambala district in the state of Haryana, India. It is 200 km north of Delhi and 55 km southwest of Chandigarh. This cantonment was established in the year 1843 and is an important centre for manufacturing of scientific and surgical instruments.

Demographics 

 India census, Ambala Cantonment had a population of 55,370. Males constitute 61% of the population and females 39%. Ambala Cantonment has an average literacy rate of 91.24%, higher than the national average of 74%; with 95.07% of the males and 85.32% of females literate. 11.41%  of the population is under 6 years of age.

Economy
Scientific and surgical instruments are manufactured in Ambala Cantonment.

Transport

Railways
Ambala Cantonment Junction railway station is a major junction. Delhi-Kalka and Saharanpur-Ludhiana's railway lines pass through this junction

By road
G.T. Road passes through Ambala Cantonment.

Places of interest
 European Cemetery

Education
Historic Colleges which were established before independence of India are also present. an example of that is Sanatan Dharma College on Ambala–Jagadhri Highway. Convent of Jesus and Mary is a girls' day-school in Ambala Cantonment.

Gallery

References

Cities and towns in Ambala district
Cantonments of India
Cantonments of British India
Ambala